HD 189733, also catalogued as V452 Vulpeculae, is a binary star system approximately 64.5 light-years away in the constellation of Vulpecula (the Fox).  The primary star is suspected to be an orange dwarf star, while the secondary star is a red dwarf star. Given that this system has the same visual magnitude as HD 209458, it promises much for the study of close transiting extrasolar planets.  The star can be found with binoculars 0.3 degrees east of the Dumbbell Nebula (M27).

As of 2005, it has been confirmed that an extrasolar planet orbits the primary star within the system.

Stellar system

HD 189733 A is an orange dwarf star of the spectral type K1.5V.  The star has a mass of 81 percent that of the Sun, a radius of 76 percent, and a luminosity of 33 percent. The star is between 89 and 102 percent as enriched in iron as the Sun, making the star more than 600 million years old.  Its absolute magnitude is 6.2.

The star has starspots which affect its luminosity by 1.5 percent in visible light. As a result, it is listed in the General Catalogue of Variable Stars as a BY Draconis variable with the variable star designation V452 Vul.

Discovered in 2006 by the infrared 2MASS astronomical survey, 2MASS J20004297+2242342 or HD 189733 B is a dim red dwarf star of spectral type M.  The companion was observed at a separation of 216 astronomical units away from the primary star.  Orbiting in a clockwise orbit (which is nearly perpendicular to the orbital plane of transiting planet HD 189733 b), the orbital period is estimated to be around 3,200 years long.

Planetary system
HD 189733 A has one known planet, designated HD 189733 b, a gaseous giant 13% larger than Jupiter close enough to complete an orbit every two days. Using spectrometry it was found in 2007 that this planet contains significant amounts of water vapour. This planet is the second extrasolar planet where definitive evidence for water has been found.

The chemical signature of water vapour was detected in the atmosphere of this planet. Although HD 189733b with atmospheric temperatures rising above  is far from being habitable, this finding increases the likelihood that water, an essential component of life, would be found on a more Earth-like planet in the future.

Astronomers have created a rough map of HD 189733b's cloud-top features using data from the Spitzer infrared space telescope.
Although Spitzer could not resolve the planet into a disk, by measuring changes as the planet rotated, the team created a simple longitudinal map. That is, they measured the planet's brightness in a series of pole-to-pole strips across the planet's visible cloud-tops, then assembled those strips into an overall picture.

Probably due to strong winds, the hottest point on the planet seems to be "offset by about 30 degrees longitudinally" from the substellar point ("high noon").

In late 2008, the spectral signature of carbon dioxide was found in HD 189733b's atmosphere.

In 2013, albedo measurements at visible wavelengths in the range of 290–570 nm using the Hubble Space Telescope STIS (Space Telescope Imaging Spectrograph) instrument, reported in the Astrophysical Journal Letters, determine the planet to have a deep blue hue due to optically thick reflective clouds containing silicates (glass) "rain". The paper detailing the results reports measurement of "geometric albedos of Ag = 0.40 ± 0.12 at 290–450 nm [near ultraviolet to blue in the visible light region of the electromagnetic spectrum] and Ag < 0.12 at 450–570 nm ... with sodium absorption suppressing the scattered light signal beyond ~450 nm as predicted by models of hot Jupiter atmospheres."

Atmospheric transmission spectrum taken in 2020 has showed the presence of opaque haze, and spectral signatures of sodium and potassium.

Transit timing variations of HD 189733 b were discovered in 2021, suggesting other planets do exist in the system.

Star-planet interaction controversy
In 2008, a team of astronomers first described how as the exoplanet orbiting HD 189733 A reaches a certain place in its orbit, it causes increased stellar flaring.  In 2010, a different team found that every time they observe the exoplanet at a certain position in its orbit, they also detected X-ray flares.  Theoretical research since 2000 suggested that an exoplanet very near to the star that it orbits may cause increased flaring due to the interaction of their magnetic fields, or because of tidal forces.  In 2019, astronomers analyzed data from Arecibo Observatory, MOST, and the Automated Photoelectric Telescope, in addition to historical observations of the star at radio, optical, ultraviolet, and X-ray wavelengths to examine these claims.  They found that the previous claims were exaggerated and the host star failed to display many of the brightness and spectral characteristics associated with stellar flaring and solar active regions, including sunspots.  Their statistical analysis also found that many stellar flares are seen regardless of the position of the exoplanet, therefore debunking the earlier claims.  The magnetic fields of the host star and exoplanet do not interact, and this system is no longer believed to have a "star-planet interaction."  Some researchers had also suggested that HD 189733 accretes, or pulls, material from its orbiting exoplanet at a rate similar to those found around young protostars in T Tauri Star systems.  Later analysis demonstrated that very little, if any, gas was accreted from the "hot Jupiter" companion.

See also
 List of extrasolar planets
 2MASS, the Two Micron All-Sky Survey
 ELODIE spectrograph

References

External links
 
 
 

K-type main-sequence stars
Planetary transit variables
M-type main-sequence stars
BY Draconis variables
Vulpecula
Planetary systems with one confirmed planet
2
Vulpeculae, V452
189733
098505
BD+22 3887
Binary stars
4130
0864
TIC objects